Saint Aubert or Saint-Aubert may refer to:

People 
 Aubert of Avranches (died 720), bishop of Avranches

Places 
 Saint-Aubert, Quebec, Canada, a municipality
 Saint-Aubert, Nord, France, a commune
 Saint Aubert, Missouri, United States, an unincorporated community
 Mokane, Missouri, a city formerly called Saint Aubert

See also 
 St. Aubert Township, Callaway County, Missouri
 Saint-Aubert-sur-Orne, Orne, France